The  4th Bangladesh National Film Awards, presented by Ministry of Information, Bangladesh to felicitate the best of Bangladeshi Cinema released in the year 1978. Ceremony took place at Vice President's House, Dhaka on November 14, 1979, and awards were given by Ziaur Rahman, President of Bangladesh.

List of winners
Awards were given in 16 categories out of 20 categories. Category for Best Lyrics was introduced in 1978 and the Amjad Hossain became the first recipient of Best Lyricist award.

Merit awards

Technical awards

See also
Meril Prothom Alo Awards
Ifad Film Club Award
Babisas Award

References

External links

National Film Awards (Bangladesh) ceremonies
Bangladesh National Film Awards
Bangladesh National Film Awards
Bangladesh National Film Awards
Bangladesh National Film Awards, 4th